Servpro is a franchisor of fire and water cleanup and restoration franchises in the United States and Canada. The franchise system provides localized services as well as large-scale disaster recovery. It is headquartered in Gallatin, Tennessee.

History 
Ted and Doris Isaacson launched Servpro Industries in 1967 as a painting business in Sacramento, California. With a background in cleaning and restoration, they transformed the company into a franchisor of cleanup and restoration specialists. After selling its first franchise in 1969, Servpro continued to grow, acquiring the Bristol-Myers Domesticare Division and its 175 franchises in 1979, and developing a highly regarded national franchise.

Servpro relocated the corporate headquarters from Sacramento to Gallatin, Tennessee in 1988. At the time of the relocation, Servpro consisted of 647 franchises. The company sold its 1,000th franchise in 2000.

In 2015, 2016, 2017 & 2019, The Tennessean listed Servpro as one of Tennessee's top workplaces.

Servpro consists of more than 1,700 franchises in the United States and Canada.

In March 2019, The Blackstone Group acquired a majority stake in Servpro Industries, LLC, for an amount reportedly exceeding US$1 billion according to the Wall Street Journal. The Isaacson family reinvested and maintains minority ownership. Sue Steen (former CEO) and Randy Isaacson (former President) retired, and Rick Isaacson was promoted from EVP to Chief Executive Officer of SERVPRO. Rick Forster was promoted to President. John Sooker was promoted from National Accounts Division Manager to COO & EVP. Matt Preston was promoted to Chief Legal Officer & VP. Jeff Fields remained CIO and became VP. Todd Lindsey has been added to the team as Chief Financial Officer.

Services 
Servpro provides residential and commercial water, fire, mold cleanup, and restoration services. Specialty services are provided by many franchises, such as biohazard cleanup, document restoration, electronics restoration, dry cleaning, and reconstruction.

Large-scale disaster recovery
Despite the franchise structure of numerous relatively small entities, Servpro has the capacity and organizational competence to respond to large-scale disasters, including major corporate and government contracts after Hurricane Katrina in 2005 and Hurricane Ike in 2008. Servpro was contracted for drainage and restoration by government, commercial entities and numerous households after the 2010 Tennessee floods. Similarly, Servpro was involved in restoration and reconstruction after Superstorm Sandy.

See also
 First Responder Bowl

References

External links 
 

Franchises
Cleaning companies of the United States
American companies established in 1967
Business services companies established in 1967
2019 mergers and acquisitions
Privately held companies based in Tennessee
1967 establishments in Tennessee
Gallatin, Tennessee
The Blackstone Group companies